The 2014 IAAF Hammer Throw Challenge was the fifth edition of the annual, global series of hammer throw competitions organised by the International Association of Athletics Federations. The winners were Krisztián Pars of Hungary (244.84 metres) and Anita Włodarczyk (232.52 metres) of Poland. This was Włodarczyk's second title, defending her win from the previous year, and a third career win for Pars (the 2011 and 2012 winner). Pars also regained the position of challenge record holder, improving on the total set by Paweł Fajdek in 2013.

A total of thirteen meetings featured on the circuit, with eight women's and nine men's contests spread across those events. The point scoring format was cumulative – the final standings were decided by the sum of athletes' three best throws on the circuit. Only the best throw by an athlete from each meet was taken into consideration.

Calendar
The 2014 series continued the model of the 2013 by featuring a combination of IAAF World Challenge meetings and non-IAAF meetings in Europe.

There were two new additions to the tour: the Mohammed VI Meeting de Marrakesh and the Paavo Nurmi Games. The Grande Premio Brasil Caixa de Atletismo and Meeting Grand Prix IAAF de Dakar – long-standing presences – were dropped from the series. The Prefontaine Classic, a Diamond League meeting, did not return.

Final standings

Men
A total of eleven men recorded valid marks at three meetings and made the final standings. Marks in bold are those which counted towards the final score.

Women
A total of twelve women recorded valid marks at three meetings and made the final standings. Marks in bold are those which counted towards the final score.

See also
2014 IAAF Diamond League

References

2014
IAAF Hammer Throw Challenge